Shiva Shambho, also known as Shiva, Sambhu and José Antonio Ramón Calderón (born August 15, 1956), is a Mexican mystic and writer.

During his youth he engaged in several spiritual practices, which led him to have mystical experiences that culminated with the experience of oneness with the absolute in November 1985. From then on he began to write and teach about spiritual matters.

In the 1990s he published detailed descriptions of the major mystical traditions of the world, the synthesis of which he called Mysticosofia. His aim was to show that all major mystical traditions seek, through various practices, to help a person advance via two major routes: the awakening of spiritual consciousness, and the creation of the body of light.

In 2014 he founded the ashram known as Casa de los Cuatro Rumbos (House of the Four Directions), near the city of Atlixco, Puebla, which offers courses and retreats.

He has published over fifty books. Hundreds of his lectures are available for free on YouTube.

He lives in Puebla, with his wife Ruth and his sons Andrés and Diego.

Childhood and adolescence: 1956–1977 
Jose Antonio Ramon Calderón was born in Puebla, Mexico, on August 15, 1956, to an upper-class family. He was the third of the six children of Casiano Ramón Pérez and María Trinidad Calderon Tell.

During his dissolute adolescence he felt an increasingly growing inner emptiness, which led him on an intense spiritual search and, eventually, to meeting his spiritual teacher.

For a short period of time he studied Anthropology at the Universidad Iberoamericana, but soon quit to dedicate himself fully to his spiritual practices.

Discipleship and spiritual awakening: 1977–1985 

On July 7, 1977, Shiva enrolled in a course of Tibetan yoga taught by Pedro Espinosa de los Monteros, who became his spiritual teacher.

The course, called "The Science of MentalPhysics", had been designed, and introduced in America, by Edwin Dingle. It subjected students to a regimen of breathing exercises, affirmations, and sexual energy transmutation practices.

After performing these practices for a year and a half, Shiva began experiencing various energy-related manifestations, or Kundalini syndrome, and some alterations of consciousness, which intensified over time. He described these experiences in a diary, which he published years later as part of an autobiographical book entitled Con los pies en el sendero del yoga y el misticismo (With my Feet on the Path of Yoga and Mysticism).

In 1979, Shiva began to meditate. He first used a technique to purge the mind, which requires being attentive and passively observant of the flow of thoughts, feelings and emotions that appear in one's stream of consciousness. Doing this ultimately leads to their disappearing, leaving the mind in a clear and quiet state.

As these experiences intensified, Shiva's interests became almost exclusively spiritual. He abandoned his Anthropology studies, and dedicated himself almost exclusively to spiritual practices, and to reading and reflecting on spiritual matters.

In July 1980, he had his first mystical experience, which he described as a contact with his higher self, and which was accompanied by "a powerful sense of timelessness or eternity."

Several mystical experiences followed, which revealed to him the "fountain that remains...beyond mutation and change...outside of time and space."

For months he struggled to remain in a state that he recognized as the one Jiddu Krishnamurti called "awareness" and which George Gurdjieff described as "self-remembering". Because of these efforts, in early 1983, Shiva permanently became what he would later describe as an "awakened man," that is, a person who is continually "simultaneously aware of himself and of his surroundings", in contrast with the common person or "sleeping man", which according to Shiva lives in a "state of psychic sleep".

On November 11, 1985 Shiva had his first experience of oneness with the absolute, in which "the whole universe disappeared, and only the infinite and eternal Absolute remained. There was no residue of individuality to realize it".

Teacher and writer: 1986–present 
Since 1986, Shiva has written several books, taught several courses, and spoken in conferences and retreats, to publicize the difference between the "sleeping state" and the "awakened state", and the practices that lead from one to the other. He has also described the path and practices that can lead an awakened person to have superior mystical experiences.

Teaching 
Misticosophy: synthesis of the world's mystical traditions.

His most significant academic work consists of having studied and described the mystical traditions of Hinduism, Buddhism, Taoism, Zen, Christianity, the Ancient Egyptian Religion, Judaism, Sufism and Toltecayotl, and synthesizing them to show that they all seek to guide humankind on how to advance on two different routes: the awakening of spiritual consciousness and the creation of the body of light. This work was published in a series of books, each of which examines a specific mystical tradition in the light of one of the two routes 

Teachings on how to advance on the route of the awakening of spiritual consciousness

These teachings address the steps and practices necessary to move from the state of a common person or "sleeping man", to a state of awareness or "awakened man." According to Shiva, the common person lives in a state of "psychic dream", a fact which is easily verifiable by conducting the following experiment:
"Pay attention to yourself and, simultaneously, to the place where you are. That is, remember yourself (in the sense of being aware of yourself, and not in the sense of thinking of yourself). Be aware of your body (do not think about it). Be mindful of it. Now you are aware of yourself. Stay in that state. Do not forget yourself, and then go on with your daily activities ... [by attempting this] you will discover how difficult it is to stay in that state, as it will not take more than a few minutes to become unaware of yourself and to return to the state of psychic dream".

Through various meditation exercises, the practitioner achieves ever longer periods of mindfulness, until the awakened state becomes permanent. That is the state "in which one is present, and simultaneously observes both the inner and outer world in a passive manner".

The awakening of a person's spiritual consciousness is a process that can be verified by that person, and it does not require him to hold any religious beliefs. In a book entitled La experiencia del Despertar (The Experience of Awakening), Shiva describes the process of awakening, and the practices that lead to it, without using any of the religious terms with which it is commonly associated. Shiva sees this work as a bridge between spirituality and science, because there is no need to believe or have faith in any of the spiritual experiences described therein, which can be confirmed empirically by the practitioner.

For those who have already reached a state of permanent spiritual wakefulness, Shiva has also laid out, in several books and lectures, the practices that lead to higher mystical experiences, which culminate with the experience of being one with the absolute.

Teachings on how to advance on the route of the creation of the body of light

These teachings address the practices needed to gradually increase the flow of energy that circulates through the body's network of energy channels, so as to naturally activate the spiritual faculties of the practitioner, thus eventually producing in him the same awakened state described above. The energy practices that Shiva recommends are mostly psychophysical breathing exercises or Pranayama, and sexual transmutation.

Casa de los Cuatro Rumbos 
In 2014, Shiva founded the ashram Casa de los Cuatro Rumbos (House of the Four Directions), near the city of Atlixco. There he teaches courses and workshops, and hosts spiritual retreats.

References

External links (Spanish language) 
 Universidad Casa de los Cuatro Rumbos
 Fundación Shiva Shambho
 Avatar Shiva Shambho
 Shiva Shambho
 Shiva Shambho Frases
 José Antonio Ramón
 Misticosofía
 Parusía
 La Experiencia del Despertar
 Toltekayotl: la Luz de México
 Mindfulness Web
 Universidad de Misticosofía

1956 births
20th-century mystics
Living people
Religious writers
Spiritual writers
Writers from Puebla